Alfredo Oscar Graciani (6 January 1965 – 21 April 2021) was an Argentine footballer. He played for a number of clubs in Argentina and also played in Switzerland and Venezuela at the end of his playing career. He had a successful career at Boca Juniors, having played 250 matches for the club, and winning two titles. Nicknamed Alfil ("bishop" in chess, due to his diagonal movements on the pitch) and Bat, Graciani is ranked 14th. among the all-time leading scorers for Boca Juniors.

Career 

Graciani started his playing career in the youth divisions of Atlanta, where his brother Néstor also played. He made his debut with the senior squad in 1981 v Gimnasia y Esgrima La Plata in Primera B, the second division of Argentine football by then. Atlanta coach Luis Artime sent him to the field on 80' substituting Carlos Landaburo. In 1983, Graciani was part of the team that won the Primera B championship promoting to Primera División. During his career at Atlanta, Graciani played a total of 89 matches, scoring 18 goals.

Graciani was also called-up for the Argentina u20 team that played in the 1983 South American championship, qualifying for the 1983 World Championship where he was part of the roster.

In 1984 Graciani was signed by Boca Juniors, where he went on to become their leading goalscorer of the 1980s, winning two international titles with the club, the 1989 Supercopa Libertadores and 1990 Recopa Sudamericana. In 1992 Graciani joined Racing Club but returned to Boca Juniors in 1993. By the end of his Boca Juniors career he had played 250 games for the club in all competitions, scoring 83 goals.

In 1994 Graciani played for Deportivo Español before dropping down a division to play for Atlético Tucumán and then Argentinos Juniors in the Primera B Nacional. Three years later, he was signed by Swiss club Lugano, finishing his career playing for Venezuelan club Caracas in 1998.

After retirement as a player, Graciani went on to work as a football coach, being part of the coaching staff at Boca under Jorge José Benítez during the 2004–05 season.

Graciani died from a cardiac arrest in Buenos Aires on 21 April 2021.

Titles 
Atlanta
 Primera B: 1983

Boca Juniors
 Supercopa Libertadores: 1989
 Recopa Sudamericana: 1990

Argentinos Juniors
 Primera B Nacional: 1996–97

References

1965 births
2021 deaths
Footballers from Buenos Aires
Argentine people of Italian descent
Argentine footballers
Argentina youth international footballers
Argentina under-20 international footballers
Association football forwards
Club Atlético Atlanta footballers
Boca Juniors footballers
Racing Club de Avellaneda footballers
Deportivo Español footballers
Atlético Tucumán footballers
Argentinos Juniors footballers
Caracas FC players
FC Lugano players
Argentine Primera División players
Argentine expatriate footballers
Argentine expatriate sportspeople in Switzerland
Expatriate footballers in Switzerland
Argentine expatriate sportspeople in Venezuela
Expatriate footballers in Venezuela